Ri Jong-man (born 8 March 1959) is a North Korean former footballer. He represented North Korea on at least twenty-three occasions between 1980 and 1990, scoring once, and also coached the national team.

Career statistics

International

International goals
Scores and results list North Korea's goal tally first, score column indicates score after each North Korea goal.

References

1959 births
Living people
North Korean footballers
North Korean football managers
North Korea international footballers
Association football midfielders
Footballers at the 1990 Asian Games
Asian Games competitors for North Korea